Arizal Effendi (23 March 19498 December 2008) was an Indonesian diplomat.

Born in Medan, North Sumatra, Arizal Effendi was a career diplomat. As Indonesian Ambassador to Australia he and his family arrived in Australia on 7 November 1999 and delivered his credentials on 19 November 1999. Addressing the National Press Club in February 2000, he called on Australia's media to be more responsible in its coverage of Indonesia, in the hope that would help to restore bilateral relations.

Arizal Effendi died on 8 December 2008 while being ambassador to France.

References

1949 births
2008 deaths
Indonesian diplomats
Ambassadors of Indonesia to Australia
Ambassadors of Indonesia to France
People from Medan
University of Indonesia alumni